Gregory Guy Jr. (born October 17, 1971) is a retired American professional basketball player most known for being the NCAA Division I scoring champion during the 1992–93 season.

He was born in Oak Park, Illinois, and his father Gregory Guy Sr. was a basketball player for Illinois State. Guy went to Oak Park and River Forest High School. He attended two different junior colleges and spent a semester at Fresno State University before transferring to the University of Texas–Pan American in December of his junior season in 1992–93. He also made an immediate impact as a transfer player by leading all of Division I in scoring with a 29.3 points per game average. Despite his explosive scoring ability, the Broncs finished the season with a 2–20 overall record. He, therefore, was on the worst team in college basketball history to have the nation's leading scorer on its roster. Texas–Pan American improved to 16–12 for Guy's senior season, and although he led the team in scoring, he did not repeat as the country's leading scorer.

After college, Guy played professional basketball abroad, including a stint on Lobos UAG in Mexico.

See also
List of NCAA Division I men's basketball season scoring leaders

References

1971 births
Living people
American expatriate basketball people in Mexico
American men's basketball players
Basketball players from Illinois
Fresno State Bulldogs men's basketball players
Lincoln Lynx basketball players
Northeastern Oklahoma A&M Golden Norsemen basketball players
Point guards
Shooting guards
Sportspeople from Oak Park, Illinois
Texas–Pan American Broncs men's basketball players
American expatriate basketball people in the Philippines
Philippine Basketball Association imports
TNT Tropang Giga players